The 2013 Campeonato Capixaba de Futebol was the 97th season of Espírito Santo's top professional football league. The competition began on January 25 and ended on May 19. Ferroviária was the champion by the 17th time.

Format
The tournament consists of a double round-robin format, in which all ten teams play each other twice. The four better-placed teams will face themselves in playoffs matches. The bottom two teams on overall classification will be relegated.

Only the champion will qualify for the 2014 Copa do Brasil. The best team on the first stage qualifies to the Série D.

Participating teams

First stage

Results

Final stage

References

2013
Capixaba